Lockwood is an unincorporated community and census-designated place (CDP) in Monterey County, California, United States. As of the 2020 census it had a population of 368.

It is a small community consisting of farms, ranches, and vineyards, in a broad valley encompassed by the coastal mountains. The ZIP Code is 93932, and the community is inside area code 831.

History
The first post office opened in 1888. The name honors Belva Lockwood, candidate for President of the United States in 1884 and 1888 on the Equal Rights Party ticket.

Geography

There is a post office in Lockwood, a community center, Fayter's Equine/Repair Service, and two stores, the Pleyto Store and the Lockwood Store.Lockwood also encompasses the San Antonio Valley Vineyards, including several more vineyards and few olive grows. There is extensive grazing land and cattle ranching in the area, and some families have been here ever since the town was founded, ranching and farming for generations.

Climate
This region experiences hot and dry summers, with average monthly temperatures above . According to the Köppen Climate Classification system, Lockwood has a warm-summer Mediterranean climate, abbreviated "Csb" on climate maps.

Demographics

The 2010 United States Census reported that Lockwood had a population of 379. The racial makeup of Lockwood was 297 (78.4%) White, 4 (1.1%) African American, 6 (1.6%) Native American, 2 (0.5%) Asian, 0 (0.0%) Pacific Islander, 56 (14.8%) from other races, and 14 (3.7%) from two or more races. Hispanic or Latino of any race were 100 persons (26.4%).

The Census reported that 379 people (100% of the population) lived in households, 0 (0%) lived in non-institutionalized group quarters, and 0 (0%) were institutionalized.

There were 163 households, out of which 44 (27.0%) had children under the age of 18 living in them, 76 (46.6%) were opposite-sex married couples living together, 10 (6.1%) had a female householder with no husband present, 5 (3.1%) had a male householder with no wife present. There were 11 (6.7%) unmarried opposite-sex partnerships, and 1 (0.6%) same-sex married couples or partnerships. 57 households (35.0%) were made up of individuals, and 18 (11.0%) had someone living alone who was 65 years of age or older. The average household size was 2.33. There were 91 families (55.8% of all households); the average family size was 3.16.

The population was spread out, with 98 people (25.9%) under the age of 18, 16 people (4.2%) aged 18 to 24, 78 people (20.6%) aged 25 to 44, 140 people (36.9%) aged 45 to 64, and 47 people (12.4%) who were 65 years of age or older. The median age was 44.5 years. For every 100 females, there were 101.6 males. For every 100 females age 18 and over, there were 108.1 males.

The homeowner vacancy rate was 1.0%; the rental vacancy rate was 13.0%. 220 people (58.0% of the population) lived in owner-occupied housing units and 159 people (42.0%) lived in rental housing units.

References

Census-designated places in Monterey County, California
Salinas Valley
Unincorporated communities in Monterey County, California
Unincorporated communities in California